Rossair Executive Air Charter was an airline based in Lanseria, South Africa, operating chartered domestic and international passenger and cargo services, aiming at corporate and leisure markets. The airline was founded in 1956, and was shut down in 2005.

Rossair Europe was based in the Netherlands. It used ATR 42 and Beechcraft 1900 aircraft.

Fleet
At January 2005, the Rossair fleet included the following small commuter aircraft:

4 de Havilland Canada DHC-6 Twin Otter Series 300
1 Bombardier Learjet 35A
1 Cessna 208B Caravan-675
6 Raytheon Beech 1900C Airliner
7 Raytheon Beech 1900D Airliner
2 Raytheon Beech King Air 200
1 Raytheon Beech King Air B200
1 Raytheon Beech King Air C90B

References

Defunct airlines of South Africa
Airlines established in 1956
Airlines disestablished in 2005
Companies based in Johannesburg
1956 establishments in South Africa
2005 disestablishments in South Africa